Trechiamiotes siamensis is a species of beetle in the family Carabidae, the only species in the genus Trechiamiotes.

References

Trechinae